Karen Bing Huang (born ) is an Irish badminton player of Chinese origin.

Biography
Originally from Shenyang in north eastern China, Bing arrived in Ireland to learn English when she was nineteen. Within six months of her arrival her skill with badminton had her selected to train with the Irish team. She works as a physical therapist and is an Irish resident who never played for China.

Bing won all three possible titles at the national championships in Ireland in 2002. She took two more title wins in 2005. In 2007 she won the Welsh International and the Irish Open, and in 2007 the Slovak International.

Achievements

IBF International 

 BWF International Challenge tournament
 BWF International Series tournament

Sources

Living people
Irish female badminton players
Irish people of Chinese descent
Chinese emigrants to Ireland
1981 births